The 1979–80 season was Kilmarnock’s 78th in Scottish League Competitions.

Scottish Premier Division

Scottish League Cup

Scottish Cup

Drybrough Cup

Anglo-Scottish Cup

See also
List of Kilmarnock F.C. seasons

References

External links
https://www.fitbastats.com/kilmarnock/team_results_season.php

Kilmarnock F.C. seasons
Kilmarnock